Donna Edwards (born 1963) is a Welsh actress. Edwards is a Bafta Cymru award-winning for Best Actress.

Early life and education
She was born in Merthyr Tydfil and raised in the village of Trefechan. She was a pupil at Vaynor and Penderyn High School where she took an early interest in drama. At 14 she was chosen as the lead role of Myfanwy Llewellyn in Off to Philadelphia in the Morning, a 1978 BBC drama series about the composer Joseph Parry. She studied Welsh and Drama at Aberystwyth University and graduated in 1984.

Career
In 1985 she was given the role of Miriam Ambrose in the Welsh-language TV drama Dinas. She has appeared in other Welsh-language productions such as Tair Chwaer and Yr Aduniad, although she may be most famous for playing Britt Monk in Pobol y Cwm.

She has also starred in a number of Welsh-based TV dramas in English such as Nuts and Bolts on ITV Wales and Belonging on BBC Wales. She has also appeared in the BBC comedy Gavin & Stacey. She has appeared in plays at the Royal Court, Clwyd Theatr Cymru and the Sherman in Cardiff.

In 2012 she played 'Mo the Bap' in the Sky1 TV comedy drama series Stella. She reprised this role for the second series. Two of her daughters have also acted, Lucy Borja who played Chloe Branagh in the first two series of Young Dracula and Sophie Borja who appeared in series four and five of The Story of Tracy Beaker as Roxy Wellard.

In 2015 she played Yvette in the National Theatre Wales production of Mother Courage at Merthyr Tydfil Labour Club.

Awards
She has won the BAFTA Cymru Best Actress Award twice – for her roles in Tair Chwaer and Belonging.

Personal life

She lives in Dinas Powys, Cardiff with her husband Ray Borja, a photographer, and two children. She has two brothers twenty years her senior; John, a policeman and Ken. She is an ambassador for the learning disability charity Mencap Cymru.

Filmography

TV

Film

References

External links
 
 Personal Twitter account

Welsh soap opera actresses
Welsh-speaking actors
Welsh television actresses
Living people
People from Merthyr Tydfil
1963 births